Belle is a feminine given name meaning "beautiful". It is often used to refer to a beautiful or very attractive young woman.

People 
 Isabella Belle Kendrick Abbott (1842–1893), American author
 Belle Baker (1893–1957), American singer and actress
 Belle Baranceanu (1902–1988), American artist
 Belle Barth (1911–1971), Jewish-American entertainer
 Belle Benchley (1882–1972), American director of the San Diego Zoo from 1927 to 1953
 Belle Bennett (1891–1932), American stage and screen actress
 Isabella Belle Boyd (1843–1900), Confederate spy during the American Civil War
 Belle Brezing (1860–1940), American brothel owner, believed to be the model for Belle Watling in Gone with the Wind
 Belle Chrystall (1910–2003), British actress
 Belle Chuo (born 1986), Taiwanese actress
 Belle Cole (1845–1905), American singer
 Belle Cooledge (1884–1955), American politician, first female mayor of Sacramento, California
 Belle Delphine (1999–), South African internet celebrity
 Belle Gibson (1991–) Australian convicted scammer
 Belle Gunness (1859–1908), Norwegian-American female serial killer
 Belle Kinney Scholz (1890–1959), Euro-American sculptor
 Belle Goshorn MacCorkle (1841–1923), American former First Lady of West Virginia
 Belle Mariano (born 2002), Filipina actress, model and singer
 Belle Mitchell (1889–1979), American film actress
 Belle Montrose (1886–1963), Irish-American actress and vaudeville performer born Isabelle Donohue
 Isabella Belle Moore (1894–1975), Scottish freestyle swimmer
 Belle Moskowitz (1877–1933), political advisor to New York Governor and 1928 presidential candidate Al Smith
 Belle Perez, stage name of Maribel Pérez (born 1976), Flemish musician and songwriter
 Belle L. Pettigrew (1839–1912), American educator, missionary
 Belle Reynolds (1840–1937), American heroine of the American Civil War
 Belle Hunt Shortridge (1858 – 1893), American author
 Ruth Isabel Belle Skinner (1866–1928), American businesswoman
 Belle Starr (1848–1889), American outlaw born Myra Maybelle Shirley Reed Starr
 Belle Story (c. 1887 - ?), American vaudeville performer and singer
 Belle Fligelman Winestine (1891-1985) American writer and suffragist

Fictional characters 

 Belle, from the fairy tale Beauty and the Beast
 Belle (Beauty and the Beast), from the 1991 Disney film Beauty and the Beast, based on the fairy tale
 Belle (Once Upon a Time) (maiden name French, married name Gold), a character from the ABC television series Once Upon a Time
 Belle (Thomas and Friends), from the TV show Thomas and Friends
 Belle Black, from the NBC soap opera Days of Our Lives
 Belle Dingle, from the ITV soap opera Emmerdale
 Belle Dupree, from the CBS sitcom Alice
 Belle Taylor, from the Seven Network soap opera Home and Away
 Belle the Sleeping Car, in Andrew Lloyd Webber's musical Starlight Express
Belle Fontiere, Lucks' right-hand girl, Tari's rival and secondary antagonist of the Meta Runner internet series
Belle the Tinkerer, from the Sonic the Hedgehog comics published by IDW

Feminine given names
Hypocorisms